Samuel McMurray (1863 – 24 August 1937) was a New Zealand cricketer. He played in four first-class matches for Canterbury from 1884 to 1897.

McMurray was born in Bangor, County Down, Ireland, in 1863, and his family migrated to New Zealand shortly afterwards, settling in Christchurch. McMurray was employed as a clerk by a company of timber merchants in Christchurch in 1878, and he eventually became the company's managing director and chairman of directors. He and his wife, who predeceased him, had three daughters.

See also
 List of Canterbury representative cricketers

References

External links
 

1863 births
1937 deaths
People from Bangor, County Down
Irish emigrants to New Zealand (before 1923)
New Zealand cricketers
Canterbury cricketers
Cricketers from Christchurch
New Zealand businesspeople